James E. FitzGerald, S.J. was the 4th President of Fairfield University located in Fairfield, Connecticut from 1958 to 1964.  During his six-year tenure the Graduate Department of Education became the Graduate School of Education in 1963, Alumni Hall was opened in 1959, and Campion Hall was opened in 1964.  Before arriving at Fairfield University, Father Fitzgerald had been the Dean of the College of Arts and Science at the College of Holy Cross in Worcester, Massachusetts.

References

External links
Rev. James E. Fitzgerald, S.J. Profile
Rev. James E. Fitzgerald, S.J., the 4th President of Fairfield University (1958-1964)

Presidents of Fairfield University
College of the Holy Cross faculty
20th-century American Jesuits
Year of birth missing
Year of death missing